Tamarindo is the Spanish word for a tamarind.

Tamarindo can also refer to:
 Tamarindo, a district in Santa Cruz canton, Guanacaste Province, Costa Rica.
 Tamarindo Wildlife Refuge, now part of Las Baulas Marine National Park.
 Tamarindo Ramsar site, part of Las Baulas Marine National Park.
 El Tamarindo, a beach area in Puerto Sandino, Nicaragua
 El Tamarindo, a settlement in Nayarit, Mexico
 Tamarindo (drink), a sweet drink also known as agua de tamarindo

See also
 Tamarind (disambiguation), other tropical trees
 Tamarin, a kind of monkey